The symbol  is known variously in English-speaking regions as the number sign, hash, or pound sign. The symbol has historically been used for a wide range of purposes including the designation of an ordinal number and as a ligatured abbreviation for pounds avoirdupois – having been derived from the now-rare .

Since 2007, widespread usage of the symbol to introduce metadata tags on social media platforms has led to such tags being known as "hashtags", and from that, the symbol itself is sometimes called a hashtag.

The symbol is distinguished from similar symbols by its combination of level horizontal strokes and right-tilting vertical strokes.

History

It is believed that the symbol traces its origins to the symbol , an abbreviation of the Roman term libra pondo, which translates as "pound weight". This abbreviation was printed with a dedicated ligature type element, with a horizontal line across, so that the lowercase letter  would not be mistaken for the numeral . Ultimately, the symbol was reduced for clarity as an overlay of two horizontal strokes "=" across two slash-like strokes "//". 

The symbol is described as the "number" character in an 1853 treatise on bookkeeping, and its double meaning is described in a bookkeeping text from 1880. The instruction manual of the Blickensderfer model 5 typewriter appears to refer to the symbol as the "number mark". Some early-20th-century U.S. sources refer to it as the "number sign", although this could also refer to the numero sign. A 1917 manual distinguishes between two uses of the sign: "number (written before a figure)" and "pounds (written after a figure)". The use of the phrase "pound sign" to refer to this symbol is found from 1932 in U.S. usage.
The term hash sign is found in South African writings from the late 1960s and from other non-North-American sources in the 1970s.

The symbol appears to have been used primarily in handwritten material; in the printing business, the numero symbol (№) and barred-lb are used for "number" and "pounds" respectively.

For mechanical devices, the symbol appeared on the keyboard of the Remington Standard typewriter. It appeared in many of the early teleprinter codes and from there was copied to ASCII, which made it available on computers and thus caused many more uses to be found for the character. The symbol was introduced on the bottom right button of touch-tone keypads in 1968, but that button was not extensively used until the advent of large scale voicemail (PBX systems, etc.) in the early 1980s.

One of the uses in computers was to label the following text as having a different interpretation (such as a command or a comment) from the rest of the text. It was adopted for use within internet relay chat (IRC) networks circa 1988 to label groups and topics. This usage inspired Chris Messina to propose a similar system to be used on Twitter to tag topics of interest on the microblogging network; this became known as a hashtag. Although used initially and most popularly on Twitter, hashtag use has extended to other social media sites.

Names
Number sign
'Number sign' is the name chosen by the Unicode consortium. Most common in Canada and the northeastern United States.  American telephone equipment companies which serve Canadian callers often have an option in their programming to denote Canadian English, which in turn instructs the system to say number sign to callers instead of pound.
Pound sign or pound
'Pound sign' or 'pound' are the most common names used in the United States, where the '#' key on a phone is commonly referred to as the pound key or simply pound. Dialing instructions to an extension such as #77, for example, can be read as "pound seven seven". This name is rarely used outside the United States, where the term pound sign is understood to mean the currency symbol £.
Hash, hash mark, hashmark
In the United Kingdom, Australia, and some other countries, it is generally called a 'hash' (probably from 'hatch', referring to cross-hatching, although the exact derivation is disputed).
Programmers also use this term; for instance  is "hash, bang" or "shebang".
Hashtag
Derived from the previous, the word 'hashtag' is often used when reading social media messages aloud, indicating the start of a hashtag. For instance, the text "#foo" is often read out loud as "hashtag foo" (as opposed to "hash foo"). This leads to the common belief that the symbol itself is called hashtag. Twitter documentation refers to it as "the hashtag symbol".
Hex
'Hex' is commonly used in Singapore and Malaysia, as spoken by many recorded telephone directory-assistance menus: "Please enter your phone number followed by the 'hex' key".  The term 'hex' is discouraged in Singapore in favour of 'hash'. In Singapore, a hash is also called 'hex' in apartment addresses, where it precedes the floor number.

, octothorpe, octathorp, octatherp
 Most scholars believe the word was invented by workers at the Bell Telephone Laboratories by 1968, who needed a word for the symbol on the telephone keypad. Don MacPherson is said to have created the word by combining octo and the last name of Jim Thorpe, an Olympic medalist. Howard Eby and Lauren Asplund claim to have invented the word as a joke in 1964, combining octo with the syllable therp which, because of the "th" digraph, was hard to pronounce in different languages. The Merriam-Webster New Book of Word Histories, 1991, has a long article that is consistent with Doug Kerr's essay, which says "octotherp" was the original spelling, and that the word arose in the 1960s among telephone engineers as a joke. Other hypotheses for the origin of the word include the last name of James Oglethorpe or using the Old English word for village, thorp, because the symbol looks like a village surrounded by eight fields. The word was popularized within and outside Bell Labs. The first appearance of "octothorp" in a US patent is in a 1973 filing. This patent also refers to the six-pointed asterisk (✻) used on telephone buttons as a "sextile".
Sharp
The same derivation is seen in the name of the Microsoft programming languages C#, J# and F#. Microsoft says, "It's not the 'hash' (or pound) symbol as most people believe. It's actually supposed to be the musical sharp symbol. However, because the sharp symbol is not present on the standard keyboard, it's easier to type the hash symbol (#). The name of the language is, of course, pronounced 'see sharp'." According to the ECMA-334 C# Language Specification, section 6, Acronyms and abbreviations, the name of the language is written "C#" ("LATIN CAPITAL LETTER C (U+0043) followed by the NUMBER SIGN # (U+0023)") and pronounced "C Sharp".
Square

On telephones, the International Telecommunication Union specification ITU-T E.161 3.2.2 states: "The symbol may be referred to as the square or the most commonly used equivalent term in other languages." Formally, this is not a number sign but rather another character, the Viewdata square . The real or virtual keypads on almost all modern telephones use the simple  instead, as does their documentation.
Other
Names that may be seen include: crosshatch, crunch, fence, flash, garden fence, garden gate, gate, grid, hak, mesh, oof, pig-pen, punch mark, rake, scratch, scratch mark, tic-tac-toe, and unequal.

Usage
When # prefixes a number, it is read as "number". A "#2 pencil", for example, indicates "a number-two pencil". The abbreviations 'No.' and '№' are used commonly and interchangeably.

When # is after a number, it is read as "pound" or "pounds", meaning the unit of weight. The text "5# bag of flour" would mean "five pound bag of flour". The abbreviations "lb." and "" are used commonly and interchangeably. But it is not a replacement for '£'.

The latter usage is rare outside North America. Where Americans might write "Symphony #5", British and Irish people usually write "Symphony No. 5". British typewriters and keyboards have a  key where American keyboards have a  key. ('$' was not substituted due to obvious problems if an attempt was made to communicate monetary values).

Mathematics 
That is, for a set , in which all  are mutually distinct,  This notation is only sometimes used for finite sets, usually in number theory, to avoid confusion with the divisibility symbol, e.g. .
 In topology, A#B is the connected sum of manifolds A and B, or of knots A and B in knot theory.
 In number theory, n# is the primorial of n.
 In constructive mathematics, # denotes an apartness relation.
 In computational complexity theory, #P denotes a complexity class of counting problems. The standard notation for this class uses the number sign symbol, not the sharp sign from music, but it is pronounced "sharp P". More generally, the number sign may be used to denote the class of counting problems associated with any class of search problems.

Computing
 In many scripting languages and data file formats, especially ones that originated on Unix,  introduces a comment that goes to the end of the line. The combination  at the start of an executable file is a "shebang", "hash-bang" or "pound-bang", used to tell the operating system which program to use to run the script (see magic number). This combination was chosen so it would be a comment in the scripting languages.
  is the symbol of the CrunchBang Linux distribution.
 In the Perl programming language,  is used as a modifier to array syntax to return the index number of the last element in the array, e.g., an array's last element is at $array[$#array]. If the array has not been defined, the return is also undefined. If the array is defined but has not had any elements assigned to it, e.g., then  returns . See the section on Array functions in the Perl language structure article.
 In both the C and C++ preprocessors, as well as in other syntactically C-like languages,  is used to start a preprocessor directive. Inside macros, after , it is used for various purposes; for example, the double pound (hash) sign  is used for token concatenation.
 In Unix shells,  is placed by convention at the end of a command prompt to denote that the user is working as root.
  is used in a URL of a web page or other resource to introduce a "fragment identifier" – an id which defines a position within that resource. In HTML, this is known as an anchor link.
 Internet Relay Chat: on (IRC) servers,  precedes the name of every channel that is available across an entire IRC network.
 In blogs,  is sometimes used to denote a permalink for that particular weblog entry.
 In lightweight markup languages, such as wikitext,  is often used to introduce numbered list items.
For example: 
 In OCaml,  is the operator used to call a method.
 In Common Lisp,  is a dispatching read macro character used to extend the S-expression syntax with short cuts and support for various data types (complex numbers, vectors and more).
 In Scheme,  is the prefix for certain syntax with special meaning.
 In Standard ML, when prefixed to a field name, becomes a projection function (function to access the field of a record or tuple); also,  prefixes a string literal to turn it into a character literal.
 In Mathematica syntax, when used as a variable, becomes a pure function (a placeholder that is mapped to any variable meeting the conditions).
 In LaTeX, when prefixing a number, references an arguments for a user defined command. For instance \newcommand{\code}[1]{\texttt{#1}}.
 In Javadoc,  is used with the  tag to introduce or separate a field, constructor, or method member from its containing class.
 In Redcode and some other dialects of assembly language,  is used to denote immediate mode addressing, e.g., which means "load accumulator A with the value 10" in MOS 6502 assembly language.
 in HTML, CSS, SVG, and other computing applications  is used to identify a color specified in hexadecimal format, e.g., . This usage comes from X11 color specifications, which inherited it from early assembler dialects that used  to prefix hexadecimal constants, e.g.: ZX Spectrum Z80 assembly.
Lines starting with characters other than "#" are treated as comments.
 The use of the hash symbol in a hashtag is a phenomenon conceived by Chris Messina, and popularized by social media network Twitter, as a way to direct conversations and topics amongst users. This has led to an increasingly common tendency to refer to the symbol itself as "hashtag".
 In J,  is the Tally or Count function, and similarly in Lua,  can be used as a shortcut to get the length of a table, or get the length of a string. Due to the ease of writing "#" over longer function names, this practice has become standard in the Lua community.
 In Dyalog APL,  is a reference to the root namespace while  is a reference to the current space's parent namespace.

Other uses
 Algebraic notation for chess: A hash after a move denotes checkmate.
 American Sign Language transcription: The hash prefixing an all-caps word identifies a lexicalized fingerspelled sign, having some sort of blends or letter drops. All-caps words without the prefix are used for standard English words that are fingerspelled in their entirety.
 Copy writing and copy editing: Technical writers in press releases often use three number signs,  directly above the boilerplate or underneath the body copy, indicating to media that there is no further copy to come.
 Footnote symbols (or endnote symbols): Due to ready availability in many fonts and directly on computer keyboards, "#" and other symbols (such as the caret) have in recent years begun to be occasionally used in catalogues and reports in place of more traditional symbols (esp. dagger, double-dagger, pilcrow).
 Linguistic phonology:  denotes a word boundary. For instance,  means that  becomes  when it is the last segment in a word (i.e. when it appears before a word boundary).
 Linguistic syntax: A hash before an example sentence denotes that the sentence is semantically ill-formed, though grammatically well-formed. For instance, "#The toothbrush is pregnant" is a grammatically correct sentence, but the meaning is odd.
 Medical prescription drug delimiter: In some countries, such as Norway or Poland,  is used as a delimiter between different drugs on medical prescriptions.
 Medical shorthand: The hash is often used to indicate a bone fracture. For example, "#NOF" is often used for "fractured neck of femur". In radiotherapy, a full dose of radiation is divided into smaller doses or 'fractions'. These are given the shorthand  to denote either the number of treatments in a prescription (e.g. 60Gy in 30#), or the fraction number (#9 of 25).
 Press releases: The notation  denotes "end", i.e. that there is no further copy to come.
 As a proofreading mark, to indicate that a space should be inserted.
 Publishing: When submitting a science fiction manuscript for publication, a number sign on a line by itself (indented or centered)  indicates a section break in the text.
 Scrabble: Putting a number sign after a word indicates that the word is found in the British word lists, but not the North American lists.
 Teletext and DVB subtitles (in the UK and Ireland): The hash symbol, resembling music notation's sharp sign, is used to mark text that is either sung by a character or heard in background music, e.g.

Unicode
In Unicode, several # characters are assigned. Other attested names in Unicode are: pound sign, hash, crosshatch, octothorpe.

At least three orthographically distinct number signs from other languages are also assigned:

On keyboards
On standard UK and some other European keyboards, the same keystrokes produce the pound (sterling) sign,  symbol, and  may be moved to a separate key above the right shift key.

See also
 sharp sign, 
 viewdata square,
 equal and parallel to symbol, 
 looped square, 
 the Chinese character for "well" 
 the game tic-tac-toe

Explanatory notes

References

Typographical symbols